Seán O'Connor (1935 – 5 February 2018) was an Irish hurler, selector, referee and Gaelic games administrator. His league and championship career at senior level with the Limerick county team lasted two seasons from 1957 until 1959.

Born in Limerick, O'Connor first played competitive hurling and Gaelic football at juvenile and underage levels with the Claughaun club. He eventually became a dual player with the club's senior teams, winning four county hurling championship medals and three county football championship medals.

O'Connor made his inter-county debut as a dual player with the Limerick minor teams. He joined the senior hurling team in 1957 and had two seasons as a member of the team.

Following his inter-county career, O'Connor served as an administrator and referee at club and county levels. He refereed the All-Ireland Senior Hurling Championship finals in 1969 and 1975, a number of Oireachtas Cup finals and 22 Munster finals at varying levels in both codes. O'Connor held most administration positions with the Claughaun club, including chairman and president, while he also served as assistant treasurer of the Limerick City Divisional Board.

Honours
Claughaun
Limerick Senior Hurling Championship (4): 1957, 1958, 1968, 1971
Limerick Senior Football Championship (3): 1955, 1959, 1967

References

1935 births
2018 deaths
All-Ireland Senior Hurling Championship Final referees
Claughaun hurlers
Claughaun Gaelic footballers
Limerick inter-county hurlers
Limerick inter-county Gaelic footballers
Hurling selectors
Hurling referees
Gaelic football referees